The Pocatello Metropolitan Statistical Area, as defined by the United States Census Bureau, is an area consisting of Bannock and Power counties in eastern Idaho, anchored by the city of Pocatello. As of the 2010 census, the MSA had a population of 82,839.  Power County was added back to the Pocatello MSA as of April 10, 2018.

Counties
Bannock
Power

Communities
Places with more than 50,000 inhabitants
Pocatello (Principal City)
Places with 10,000 to 50,000 inhabitants
Chubbuck
Places with 1,000 to 10,000 inhabitants
American Falls
Fort Hall (census-designated place)
Places with 500 to 1,000 inhabitants
Arbon Valley
Downey
Inkom
Lava Hot Springs
McCammon
Places with less than 500 inhabitants
Arimo
Rockland
Arbon
Fairview
Neeley
Pauline
Roy

Demographics
As of the census of 2000, there were 83,103 people, 29,752 households, and 21,192 families residing within the MSA. The racial makeup of the MSA was 90.61% White, 0.55% African American, 2.94% Native American, 0.93% Asian, 0.15% Pacific Islander, 2.89% from other races, and 1.93% from two or more races. Hispanic or Latino of any race were 6.23% of the population.

The median income for a household in the MSA was $34,455, and the median income for a family was $40,439. Males had a median income of $32,866 versus $22,263 for females. The per capita income for the MSA was $15,578.

See also
Idaho census statistical areas

References

 
Metropolitan areas of Idaho